Elbbrücken (Elbe bridges) may refer to:

Elbe bridges, several different bridges over River Elbe
Elbbrücken (Hamburg), the specific bridges over River Elbe in Hamburg, Germany
Elbbrücken station, a station in Hamburg, Germany, named after Hamburg Elbbrücken